Herbert Aaron Hauptman (February 14, 1917 – October 23, 2011) was an American mathematician and Nobel laureate. He pioneered and developed a mathematical method that has changed the whole field of chemistry and opened a new era in research in determination of molecular structures of crystallized materials. Today, Hauptman's direct methods, which he continued to improve and refine, are routinely used to solve complicated structures. It was the application of this mathematical method to a wide variety of chemical structures that led the Royal Swedish Academy of Sciences to name Hauptman and Jerome Karle recipients of the 1985 Nobel Prize in Chemistry.

Life
He was born in to a Jewish family in New York City, the oldest child of Leah (Rosenfeld) and Israel Hauptman. He was married to Edith Citrynell since November 10, 1940, with two daughters, Barbara (1947) and Carol (1950).

He was interested in science and mathematics from an early age which he pursued at Townsend Harris High School, graduated from the City College of New York (1937) and obtained an M.A. degree in mathematics from Columbia University in 1939.

After the war he started a collaboration with Jerome Karle at the Naval Research Laboratory in Washington, D.C. and at the same time enrolled in the Ph.D. program at the University of Maryland, College Park. He received his Ph.D. from the University of Maryland in 1955 in physics, which is part of the University of Maryland College of Computer, Mathematical, and Natural Sciences. This combination of mathematics and physical chemistry expertise enabled them to tackle head-on the phase problem of X-ray crystallography. His work on this problem was criticized because, at the time, the problem was believed unsolvable.
By 1955 he had received his Ph.D. in mathematics, and they had laid the foundations of the direct methods in X-ray crystallography. Their 1953 monograph, "Solution of the Phase Problem I. The Centrosymmetric Crystal", contained the main ideas, the most important of which was the introduction of probabilistic methods through a development of the Sayre equation.

In 1970 he joined the crystallographic group of the Medical Foundation of Buffalo of which he was Research Director in 1972. During the early years of this period he formulated the neighborhood principle and extension concept. These theories were further developed during the following decades.

In 2003, as an atheist and secular humanist, he was one of 22 Nobel laureates who signed the Humanist Manifesto.

Works
Hauptman has authored over 170 publications, including journal articles, research papers, chapters and books. In 1970, Hauptman joined the crystallographic group of the Hauptman-Woodward Medical Research Institute (formerly the Medical Foundation of Buffalo) of which he became Research Director in 1972. Until his death, he served as President of the Hauptman-Woodward Medical Research Institute as well as Research Professor in the Department of Biophysical Sciences and Adjunct Professor in the Department of Computer Science at the University at Buffalo. Prior to coming to Buffalo, he worked as a mathematician and supervisor in various departments at the Naval Research Laboratory from 1947. He received his B.S. from City College of New York, M.S. from Columbia University and Ph.D. from the University of Maryland, College Park.

Awards and titles

Belden Prize in Mathematics, City College of New York, 1936
Scientific Research Society of America, Pure Science Award, Naval Research Laboratory, 1959
President, Philosophical Society of Washington, 1969–1970
President of the Association of Independent Research Institutes, 1979–1980
Patterson Award in 1984 given by the American Crystallographic Association
Nobel Prize in Chemistry, 1985 (jointly with Jerome Karle)
Honorary degrees from the University of Maryland, College Park in 1985
Honorary degree from CCNY in 1986
Citizen of the Year Award, Buffalo Evening News, 1986
Norton Medal, SUNY, 1986
Schoellkopf Award, American Chemical Society (Western New York Chapter) 1986
Golden Plate Award of the American Academy of Achievement, 1986
Cooke Award, SUNY, 1987
Establishment of the Eccles-Hauptman Student Award, SUNY in 1987
Election to the National Academy of Sciences in 1988
Humanist Laureate Award from the International Humanist and Ethical Union in 1988
Honorary degree from the University of Parma, Italy in 1989
Honorary degree from the D'Youville College, Buffalo, New York in 1989
Honorary degree from Bar-Ilan University, Israel in 1990
Honorary degree from Columbia University in 1990
Honorary degree from Technical University of Lodz, Poland in 1992
Honorary degree from Queen's University, Kingston, Canada in 1993
Honorary degree from  SUNY at Buffalo, Buffalo, New York in 2009

References

External links

Dr Hauptman's CV
Pergament: A PBS portrait of Buffalo's Nobel winner Herbert Hauptman
Board of Science Advisors, The Buffalo International Film Festival, Buffalo, NY, United States

1917 births
2011 deaths
Nobel laureates in Chemistry
American Nobel laureates
Members of the United States National Academy of Sciences
20th-century American mathematicians
21st-century American mathematicians
American people of German-Jewish descent
Jewish American scientists
Jewish chemists
Jewish American atheists
Columbia Graduate School of Arts and Sciences alumni
American physical chemists
University of Maryland, College Park alumni
City College of New York alumni
Townsend Harris High School alumni
Secular humanists
Mathematicians from New York (state)